Neoicoceratoidea, formerly called Neoicocerataceae, is one of seventeen superfamilies of the Goniatitina suborder. Neoicoceratoidea comprises forms previously (Miller et al) included in the Neoioceratidae and Metalegoceratidae, previously included in the Goniatitacae.  These, along with new families defined for certain genera, including one from the Schistoceratidae, have been recombined as the Neoicocerataceae.

Notes

References
 Neoicoceratoidea in GONIAT Onlinn 6/14/12 
 A.K. Miller, W.M. Furnish, & O.H. Schindewolf, 1957. Paleozoic Forms; Treatise on Invertebrate Paleontology Part L, Ammonoidea.  Geological Society of America and University of Kansas Press. 
  

 
Goniatitida superfamilies
Goniatitina